The 2002 Tour de France was a multiple-stage bicycle race held from 6 to 28 July, and the 89th edition of the Tour de France. The event started in Luxembourg and ended in Paris. The Tour circled France counter-clockwise, visiting the Pyrenees before the Alps. It has no overall winner—although American cyclist Lance Armstrong originally won the event, the United States Anti-Doping Agency announced in August 2012 that they had disqualified Armstrong from all his results since 1998, including his seven Tour de France wins from 1999 to 2005; the Union Cycliste Internationale confirmed the result.

The favourite was Armstrong, who was, at the time, the winner in the 1999, 2000 and 2001 races. The main opposition would probably come from the ONCE team with Joseba Beloki (3rd last year), Igor González de Galdeano (5th last year) and Marcos Serrano (9th last year), and from the Kelme riders Óscar Sevilla (7th last year, 2nd in last year's Vuelta a España) and Santiago Botero (8th last year). Other riders to keep in account for a high place in the final rankings were Tyler Hamilton (2nd Giro 2002), Levi Leipheimer (3rd Vuelta 2001), Christophe Moreau (4th Tour 2000) and Armstrong's teammate Roberto Heras (4th Vuelta 2001). Important riders who were not present were Jan Ullrich (2nd last year, injury) and Gilberto Simoni (winner 2001 Giro).

Teams

Teams qualified for the 2002 Tour de France by various methods.  was selected because it included the winner of the previous edition, Lance Armstrong.  was selected because it included the winner of the 2001 UCI Road World Cup, Erik Dekker. A further seven teams qualified based on the UCI ranking in the highest UCI division at the end of 2001, after compensating for transfers. Five more teams were given wildcards by the organiser of the Tour, Amaury Sport Organisation. After the wildcards were given, it was announced that Saeco's main rider Gilberto Simoni had tested positive for cocaine on two occasions. In total, 21 teams participated, each with 9 cyclists, for a total of 189 cyclists.

The teams entering the race were:

Qualified teams

Invited teams

Route and stages

In the first week, the stages were mostly flat in the North of France. The last two weeks had mountain stages in the Pyrenees and Alps.

Race overview

The Prologue was won by Lance Armstrong with Laurent Jalabert and Raimondas Rumšas coming in 2nd and 3rd respectively. Armstrong and his incredibly dominant US Postal team were not concerned with defending the Yellow Jersey in the early flat stages and it changed hands a few times. First it went to Rubens Bertogliati who wore it during Stage 2 and Stage 3, where Robbie McEwen defeated Erik Zabel in the sprint gaining enough time for the latter to wear the maillot jaune in Stage 4, which was a Team Time Trial. Team ONCE–Eroski won the TTT and their rider Igor González de Galdeano took over the overall lead. At this point in the Tour all of the Top 10 overall riders were either members of team ONCE or US Postal Cycling Team, but with two more ITT's and the Mountain stages to come this meant nothing as far as the overall standings, although it did make clear the fact that these two teams were in command within the Peloton.

The ensuing flat stages were won by Jaan Kirsipuu, Erik Zabel, Bradley McGee and Karsten Kroon and by the end of Stage 8 places 1-7 were all riders for ONCE with Gonzalez leading his teammate Joseba Beloki by :04 for the overall lead as the next riders from other teams were Armstrong in 8th and Tyler Hamilton of team CSC in 9th.

Stage 9 was an Individual Time Trial won by Santiago Botero and perhaps surprisingly seven riders finished within one minute of the stage winner when it was assumed by pundits that very few riders would keep Armstrong (who finished 2nd) that close and nobody would beat him. Following the ITT Gonzalez was still in Yellow leading the GC with Armstrong in 2nd overall, Beloki in 3rd and because of their strong performances in the ITT Serhiy Gonchar and Botero moved into 4th and 5th place in the General Classification.

Stage 10 was a hilly stage with a sprint finish won by Patrice Halgand of team Jean Latour. In places 2-11 were Jérôme Pineau of team Bonjour, Stuart O'Grady of Credit Agricole, Ludo Dierckxsens of Lampre, Pedro Horrillo of Mapei, Andy Flickinger of AG2R, Nicolas Vogondy of FDJ, Nico Mattan of Cofidis, Constantino Zaballa of Kelme, Enrico Cassani of Domo and Unai Extebarria of Euskadel.

Spanish team ONCE with Beloki, Gonzalez and Abraham Olano, and American team US Postal with Armstrong, a young Floyd Landis, Viatcheslav Ekimov and the dominant Spanish rider Roberto Heras, a former Vuelta a España champion, would have the battle for the 2002 Tour de France in the mountains.

In Stage 11 Laurent Jalabert lead the stage from kilometer 6 all the way until kilometer 155 when Armstrong caught and dropped him 3 km from the finish. US Postal controlled the pace of the Peloton for most of the race. Heras lead the way setting such a high pace that most of Armstrong's rivals were dropped before Armstrong even had to put in any work of his own, but when Armstrong finally did attack only his own teammate Heras and Beloki could stay with him, but before long Armstrong was on his own headed for the Yellow Jersey.

In Stage 12 Jalabert attacked early again with Isidro Nozal and Laurent Dufaux going with him. About halfway through the stage the chase-1 group was about 3:00 behind with Richard Virenque, Eddy Mazzoleni and Alexandre Botcharov while once again US Postal with George Hincapie at the front dictated the pursuit of the main field/peloton just over 4:00 behind Jalabert, who was once again caught less than 10 km from the finish after leading the race for most of the day.

Once again Heras fractured the group of the final ten elite riders left with only Armstrong and Beloki able to match his pace and once again when Armstrong launched his attack neither Heras or Beloki could go with him as they finished 2nd and 3rd to him 1:04 behind. Botero and Gonzalez were able to get within seven seconds of Heras and Beloki while Rumsas and Carlos Sastre finished about a minute and a half behind Armstrong.

Stage 13 was an intermediate stage and in the green jersey sprinters competition Erik Zabel and Robbie McEwen were only separated by one point. Laurent Jalabert's relentless attacks and combative riding was paying off as not only was he in the Polka Dot Jersey as King of the Mountains but he had also moved into a top 10 position in the overall standings. The stage was won by David Millar as the GC situation remained the same.

Armstrong would only build on his lead as the race progressed and by the time the Tour crossed Mont Ventoux, the Alps and arrived in Paris Beloki was still 2nd more than 7:00 behind as Rumsas completed the podium with Colombian rider Botero in 4th and Gonzalez in 5th. White Jersey winner Ivan Basso would finish 11th overall and would become one of the only serious challengers to Lance Armstrong in the coming Tours.

Following the USADA decision ten years later, which was confirmed by the UCI, Armstrong had this, and every result after 1998 vacated. It was also decided it was best for the sport and as an example to riders of future generations that the 2nd, 3rd and 4th place riders would not be moved up to 1st, 2nd and 3rd.

Doping

Subsequent to Armstrong's statement to withdraw his fight against United States Anti-Doping Agency's (USADA) charges, on 24 August 2012, the USADA said it would ban Armstrong for life and stripped him of his record seven Tour de France titles. Later that day it was confirmed in a USADA statement that Armstrong was banned for life and would be disqualified from any and all competitive results obtained on and subsequent to 1 August 1998, including forfeiture of any medals, titles, winnings, finishes, points and prizes. On 22 October 2012, the Union Cycliste Internationale endorsed the USADA sanctions, and decided not to award victories to any other rider or upgrade other placings in any of the affected events.

Classification leadership and minor prizes

There were several classifications in the 2002 Tour de France. The most important was the general classification, calculated by adding each cyclist's finishing times on each stage. The cyclist with the least accumulated time was the race leader, identified by the yellow jersey; the winner of this classification is considered the winner of the Tour.

Additionally, there was a points classification, which awarded a green jersey. In the points classification, cyclists got points for finishing among the best in a stage finish, or in intermediate sprints. The cyclist with the most points lead the classification, and was identified with a green jersey.

There was also a mountains classification. The organisation had categorised some climbs as either hors catégorie, first, second, third, or fourth-category; points for this classification were won by the first cyclists that reached the top of these climbs first, with more points available for the higher-categorised climbs. The cyclist with the most points lead the classification, and wore a white jersey with red polka dots.

The fourth individual classification was the young rider classification, which was marked by the white jersey. This was decided the same way as the general classification, but only riders under 26 years were eligible.

For the team classification, the times of the best three cyclists per team on each stage were added; the leading team was the team with the lowest total time.

In addition, there was a combativity award given after each mass-start stage to the cyclist considered most combative, who wore a red number bib the next stage. The decision was made by a jury composed of journalists who gave points. The cyclist with the most points from votes in all stages led the combativity classification. Laurent Jalabert won this classification, and was given overall the super-combativity award.

There were also two special awards each with a prize of €3000, the Souvenir Henri Desgrange, given in honour of Tour founder and first race director Henri Desgrange to the first rider to pass the summit of the Col du Galibier on stage 16, and the Souvenir Jacques Goddet, given in honour of the second director Jacques Goddet to the first rider to pass the summit of the Col d'Aubisque on stage 11. Santiago Botero won the Henri Desgrange and Laurent Jalabert won the Jacques Goddet.

In stage 1, Laurent Jalabert wore the green jersey.
In stages 2 and 3, David Millar wore the white jersey.
In stage 4, Robbie McEwen wore the green jersey.

Final standings

General classification

Points classification

Mountains classification

Young rider classification

Team classification

Combativity classification

Notes

References

Bibliography

Further reading

External links

 
 2002 Tour de France at Cyclingnews.com

 
2002
2002 in French sport
July 2002 sports events in France